Fuciniceras is an extinct cephalopod genus included in the ammonoid family Hildoceratidae, (order Ammonitida),  that lived during the Pliensbachian stage of the Early Jurassic.
The shell of Fuciniceras is generally  small, evlute, and strongly ribbed.

References
Notes

Bibliography
Treatise on Invertebrate Paleontology, Part L (Ammonoidea). Geological Society of America and University of Kansas Press, 1957.

Ammonitida genera
Hildoceratidae
Early Jurassic ammonites
Ammonites of Europe